Craig Paul Johnson (born September 16, 1963) is an American politician currently serving as the representative of the 67th District in the Iowa House of Representatives. He was previously elected as a Republican member of the Iowa State Senate's 32nd district in 2016. He defeated Democratic incumbent Brian Schoenjahn. He previously ran for election to the Iowa House of Representatives in 2014 for the 64th district. Johnson, born and raised in Independence, Iowa, is a financial planner and former sales and engineer manager.

As of February 2020, Johnson serves on the following committees: State Government (Vice Chair), Appropriations, Commerce, Education, and Human Resources. He also serves on the Transportation, Infrastructure, and Capitals Appropriations Subcommittee (Chair), as well as the Capital Projects Committee, State Government Efficiency Review Committee, and the Capitol Planning Commission.

References 

1963 births
Living people
University of Northern Iowa alumni
Republican Party Iowa state senators
21st-century American politicians